Pawel Kruba (born March 21, 1990) is a Canadian football linebacker who is currently a free agent. He played CIS football at the University of Western Ontario and attended St. Anne Catholic High School in Windsor, Ontario. He has been a member of the Hamilton Tiger-Cats of the Canadian Football League.

College career
Kruba played for the Western Ontario Mustangs from 2009 to 2013. He finished his CIS career with 116 tackles, eight tackles for a loss, three sacks, five interceptions, two interceptions returned for touchdowns, a fumble forced and a fumble recovery. He received the CIS Presidents' Trophy for "Most Outstanding Defensive Player" in 2013. He was named a first-team All-Canadian and first-team OUA All-Star in 2013. Kruba was also a second team OUA All-Star in 2012.

Professional career

Hamilton Tiger-Cats
Kruba signed with the Hamilton Tiger-Cats on January 29, 2014. He was released by the Tiger-Cats on May 26, 2015.

References

External links
Hamilton Tiger-Cats bio

Living people
1990 births
Players of Canadian football from Ontario
Canadian football linebackers
Western Mustangs football players
Hamilton Tiger-Cats players
People from Essex County, Ontario